The Po Hing Fong landslide was an accidental collapse of a retaining wall in Po Hing Fong, Hong Kong on July 17, 1925. It was located next to the Blake Garden, causing 75 deaths. It is the landslide accident with the largest number of deaths in the history of Hong Kong.

References

External links
Gwulo: Old Hong Kong - Photos of Po Hing Fong landslide 1925
Gwulo: Old Hong Kong - Workers clearing away the debris of the collapsed retaining wall and houses at Po Hing Fong in July 1925

1925 in Hong Kong
Sheung Wan